Glasgow Airport Link was an airport bus which also looped through the centre of the city in Glasgow, Scotland. The service provided a direct connection to the airport for hotels, tourist destinations, shopping areas, convention and conference facilities, the bus terminal and numerous other locations, in contrast to the Glasgow Flyer which is designed to provide a direct express service between the city's transportation hubs.

History
Starting in 1991, Fairline Coaches originally operated a route 905 bus service to Glasgow Airport under contract to Scottish Citylink. All of the buses were in the Scottish Citylink yellow and blue colours, although the timetable stated that sometimes buses in Fairline's livery may be used. Some journeys were run by Arriva Scotland West.

In 2007, the service was replaced by the Arriva operated Glasgow Flyer, which was announced on 1 June that year, with a start date of 9 July, and subsequently route 905 was withdrawn.

Fairline Coaches revived their airport service, and ran it independently, again using the route number 905. This is the Glasgow Airport Link.

From 11 August 2008, the service was taken over by First Glasgow and named AirLink, running as their service 757, operating a revised route that goes along the Clydeside Express Way to the SECC and then city centre, instead of stopping at the hotels in the Kelvingrove area of the West End, that route is now taken by the 747 service  The timetable and frequency have remained largely unchanged. Existing Glasgow Airport Link long-term tickets were accepted on the First service until 30 September 2008.

Vehicles used
The service was operated by a fleet of Optare Solos. These varied in age, but most were newer models; most of them were also used on Fairline's share of the previous Route 905, and have been repainted silver.

Route
The basic daytime frequency of the service was every 20 minutes. The first journey started at 05:50, and the route ended at 23:59. In Glasgow City Centre, the route followed a "loop", connecting various parts, and special fares were available on this section. On average, journeys take 35 minutes towards the city centre, and slightly less on their return, due to the one-way system. The journey was over 15 minutes longer than the more direct Glasgow Flyer.
The route is as follows:

Departing airport
Glasgow Airport, stance 2
Govan Bus Station
Glasgow Science Centre
SECC
Sauchiehall Street, Derby Street
Renfrew Street, Thistle Hotel
Buchanan bus station, stance 45

Departing city centre
Buchanan bus station, stance 45
North Hanover Streetm, for Queen Street station
George Square, for tourist information
St Vincent Place, Buchanan Street
Wellington Street,  Holm Street
Argyle Street, Washington Street
SECC
Glasgow Science Centre
Govan Bus Station
Glasgow Airport, stance 2

See also
Glasgow Flyer
List of bus operators of the United Kingdom

References

External links
Glasgow Airport Link 
Fairline Coaches

Bus routes in Scotland
Transport in Glasgow